House of Deréon was a ready-to-wear fashion line introduced by singer and actress Beyoncé and her mother/stylist Tina Lawson. The style and concept is inspired by three generations of women in their family, with the name "Deréon" paying tribute to Beyoncé's maternal grandmother, Agnèz Deréon (mother of Tina Lawson). As of 2012 the junior line Deréon has been discontinued.

House of Deréon

Deréon was introduced in 2006, with the tag line, "Where the sidewalk and catwalk meet". The line includes casualwear, such as sweatpants and embroidered hooded sweatshirts. The House of Deréon was introduced on The Oprah Winfrey Show, and was also featured on The Tyra Banks Show. The clothing mixes hip-hop influences, such as its use of denim, with ultra-feminine flourishes like embroidery and ruffles. In an interview with Ebony magazine, Beyoncé said "I love the clothes from the '70s, my mother's clothes. I love clothes from the '40s, my grandmother's style, so elegant. We wanted to take elements from my grandmother's legacy—the beaded lace, lush colors, fine fabrics—and mix them with clothes from my mother's generation and my generation."

Often featured, such as on the back pockets of jeans, is the agu (this is often confused with the fleur de lis which is commonly featured on the back pockets of Deréon jeans (introduced in 2006, House of Deréon's junior line.) Additionally in the line's design are styles that allude to Agnèz Deréon's era, such as retro pencil skirts. It is reported  that Beyoncé has an active role in the House of Deréon's design department, approving and discussing fashion designs and ideas. As for the line's latest venture, Tina Lawson designed a collection of vintage-inspired dresses that will be available at Bloomingdale's. The line is based on 1950s-style dresses that Beyonce wore for her role as Etta James in the film Cadillac Records.

Beyoncé also mentions the clothing line in the song "Get Me Bodied", from the album B'Day, and in her song "Single Ladies (Put a Ring on It)", from the 2008 album I Am ... Sasha Fierce.

London launch
Following her appearance at New York Fashion Week, Beyoncé traveled to London, England, to debut the House of Deréon Autumn/Winter "Global Nomad" collection at Selfridges during London Fashion Week. Celebrities like Chipmunk, Ellie Goulding, Alexandra Burke, and Rita Ora attended the show. Beyoncé appeared wearing a black sequin suit with her mother Tina on stage. During an interview with CNN, Beyoncé revealed the inspiration behind her Autumn/Winter collection saying,

This collection was inspired by a lot of my travels. I did a world tour, I traveled to Asia, Brazil, all over the world and I saw such beauty and my mother traveled with me and we decided we should mix these great cultures together and make something original and beautiful, and this show celebrates the global nomad, and one day at the rate we're going which is such a beautiful thing, there won't be all these different races we'll all just be mixed up and beautiful and that is so wonderful exciting and refreshing you know we have the mixtures of the African hair wraps and some of the Asian prints and we mix it with different textures sequins and gold jewellery and it just becomes very refreshing.

September 17, 2011 marked the official launch in London at Selfridges of House of Deréon International Collection by Beyoncé and Tina Lawson via a fashion show featuring both the Autumn-Winter and Holiday 2011 collections. The House of Deréon fashion collection launch at Selfridges is a global exclusive – the line was previously only available in the United States.

House of Deréon North American relaunch
In 2012, House of Deréon will be revitalized with new clothing designs that will range from chic ready-to-wear to more upscale sophisticated clothing. The brand will also include a new design team with Tina Lawson still remaining as head designer. The junior line Deréon will be discontinued as of 2012.

Agnèz Beyincé 

Agnèz Beyincé (born Agnès DeRouen; 1909-1984), was a Louisiana native, whose birth surname and passion for creating beauty from the mundane is the inspiration for House of Deréon, a fashion line founded by her daughter, Tina Knowles, and her granddaughter, Beyoncé Knowles.

Agnèz Deréon was born on July 1, 1909 in Delcambre, Louisiana, a town near the city of New Iberia, Louisiana. Deréon was the daughter of Eugène Gustave "Eugenie" DeRouen (1860–1937) and Odilia Broussard (daughter of E.R. Broussard and Josephine Lesser). She and her family were Louisiana Créoles. Self-taught, she became a well-known seamstress catering to private clients in Louisiana. She was accustomed to tailoring pieces that stood out by decorating the fabrics she used with such embellishments as embroidery, appliques and smocking. Incorporating materials such as lace, beads and jeweled buttons, Deréon made her style unique, according to the House of Deréon official website.

Deréon, later, married Lumis Beyincé of Abbeville, Louisiana, at which point her surname changed from Deréon to Beyincé. Lumis was the son of Alexandre Beyincé (Boyancé) and Marie Olivier. The couple relocated to Galveston, Texas where they raised their family (some of the Beyincé relatives still live in Galveston). Both Agnèz and Lumis Beyincé were French-speaking Creoles of predominantly French, African and Native American descent.

The Beyincé family was upwardly mobile. The couple made many sacrifices to see that their children matriculated through private school and received a proper education. In an interview with Ebony magazine, Tina Knowles recalls that her mother made altar boy robes and other garments for the church so her children could attend Catholic schools.

Controversy 
In May 2008, the fashion line released advertisements for its girls line called "The Deréon Girls Collection".  The fashion line infuriated critics when the advertisement displayed seven-year-old girls in full makeup and high heels. A poll online on the Washington Post website has stated that 62% of the readers believe the advertisements oversexualize young girls.

References

Clothing brands of the United States
Products introduced in 2006
Jeans by brand
Beyoncé

fr:Beyoncé Knowles#House of Deréon